Order 7161 is the top secret USSR State Defense Committee Order no 7161ss (Постановление № 7161cc ГКО СССР) of December 16, 1944 about mobilisation and internment of able-bodied Germans for reparation works in the USSR. (The Cyrillic "cc" after the order number is the Russian abbreviation for "top secret".) It was part of the organisation of forced labor of Germans in the Soviet Union since the ending period of World War II.

Order 7161 instructed recipients to intern all able-bodied Germans of ages 17–45 (men) and 18-30 (women) residing within the territories of Romania (69,332 persons), Hungary (31,923 persons), Yugoslavia (10,935 persons), Czechoslovakia (215 persons) and Bulgaria (75 persons), which were under the control of the Red Army, for deportation to the Soviet Union in order to perform manual, reparation works.

The order remained secret in the Soviet-dominated eastern bloc until the dissolution of the USSR.

The implementation of the order was assigned to the NKVD secret police and was taken up by its department of the Main Administration for Affairs of Prisoners of War and Internees (Russian abbreviation: GUPVI).

See also
POW labor in the Soviet Union

References

(Pavel Polian, Against Their Will... A History and Geography of Forced Migrations in the USSR), ОГИ Мемориал, Moscow, 2001,  (in Russian)
Dokumentation der Vertreibung der Deutschen aus Ost-Mitteleuropa./ Bearb. von T. Schieder. Bd. 1–5. Wolfenbattel, 1953–1961 (in German)
Die Deutschen Vertreibungsverluste. Bevolkerungsbilanzen fuer die deutschen Vertreibungsgebiete 1939/50. Wiesbaden, 1958 (in German)
Rhode G. Phasen und Formen der Massenzwangswanderungen in Europa. // Die Vertriebenen in Westdeutschland. Bd. 1. Kiel, 1959 (in German)
Karner, Stefan,  Im Archipel GUPVI. Kriegsgefangenschaft und Internierung in der Sowjetunion 1941-1956. Wien-München 1995 (in German)
Sharkov, Anatoli, GUPVI Archipelago: Prisoners of War and Internees on the Territory of Belarus: 1944-1951 (2003), Minsk, Belarus,  (in Russian) 

Post–World War II forced migrations
Unfree labor in the Soviet Union
Aftermath of World War II in Germany
Aftermath of World War II in the Soviet Union
Government documents of the Soviet Union
Unfree labor during World War II
1944 in the Soviet Union
1944 documents